Gadul Singh Lama, popularly known as Sanu Lama, is an Indian fiction writer, poet and translator of Nepali literature. An engineer by profession, he has published three short story anthologies and his stories have been translated into English, Hindi, Urdu, Assamese and Oriya languages. He is a recipient of Sahitya Akademi Award (1993), apart from other awards such as Sikkim Bhanu Puraskar, Dr. Shova Kanti Thegim Smrithi Puraskar and Madan Byakhanmala Puraskar. The Government of India awarded him the fourth highest civilian honour of the Padma Shri, in 2005, for his contributions to literature.

Biography 
Gadul Singh Lama was born on 15 June 1939 in Gangtok, in the Northeast Indian state of Sikkim to Chandraman Ghising and Phulmaya Ghising. After matriculating from the Sir Tyashi Namgyal High School (present day Tashi Namgyal Academy) in 1956 and, getting selected for the education initiative as a part of the 7 Year Development Programme of the government, secured a diploma in Engineering from MBC Institute of Engineering, Burdwan in West Bengal, in 1959. Later, he joined the Sikkim State government service as an engineer and served there for 38 years before superannuating as the Chief Engineer.

Lama started writing from his school days and is reported to have been inspired by one of his teachers, Rashmi Prasad Alley, a writer and one of the pioneers of Nepali education in Sikkim. His first article was published in Changya, a local literary magazine. He published his first short story anthology, Katha Sampad, in 1971, composed of stories such as Swasni Manchey, Khani Tarma Ekdin, Phurbhale Gaun Chadyo and Asinapo Manchey, which has since been selected as a prescribed text for the civil services examination of the Union Public Service Commission. This was followed by Gojika in 1981 and Mrigatrishna in 1993, the latter winning him the Sahitya Akademi Award for the year. He has also written an autobiographical novel, Himalchuli Manitira, a travelogue, Aangan Paratira, a poem anthology, Jahan BagcchaTista Rangit and two translated religious works, Bhagawan Bhiddha Jeewan ra Darshan and Guru Padmasambhava.

Sanu Lama is one of the founders of the Bhartiya Nepali Rashtriya Parishad and served as its secretary on its inception. He is a member of the Editorial Advisory Board of the National Book Trust (NBT) and serves as the general secretary of the Nepali Sahitya Parishad Sikkim, an autonomous literary organization under the Government of Sikkim. He is associated with the Sikkim Akademi, is a former member of the Advisory Board for Nepali literature of the Sahitya Akademi and the president of the Himalayalan Writers' Forum. Besides the 1993 Sahitya Akademi Award, he has received awards such as Sikkim Bhanu Puraskar, Dr. Shova Kanti Thegim Smrithi Puraskar and Madan Byakhanmala Puraskar. The Government of India included him in the 2005 Republic Day Honours list for the civilian honour of the Padma Shri. He lives in Gangtok, the capital of Sikkim.

See also 
 Nepali literature
 List of Sahitya Akademi Award winners for Nepali
 Tashi Namgyal Academy

References

External links 
 

Recipients of the Padma Shri in literature & education
1939 births
Living people
People from Gangtok
Indian male short story writers
Indian male novelists
Indian male poets
Nepali-language poets
Recipients of the Sahitya Akademi Award in Nepali
Nepali-language writers from India
20th-century Indian short story writers
20th-century Indian poets
20th-century Indian novelists
20th-century Indian male writers
Nepali-language poets from India
Tamang people